The Järvi family is a famous Estonian musical family, which was started by the Estonian conductor Vallo Järvi.

Members 
Conductor Vallo Järvi, his brother/conductor Neeme Järvi, and Neeme's sons Paavo Järvi, Kristjan Järvi, and daughter Maarika.

Vallo Järvi has two sons, violist Andrus Järvi and cellist Teet Järvi. Andrus Järvi is married to pianist Sirje Järvi and they have three children (Markus Järvi, Maria Järvi and Margarete Järvi). Teet Järvi's wife is a pianist (Mari Järvi) and they have five children, all of whom are musicians (Marius Järvi, Miina Järvi, Mihkel Järvi, Madis Järvi and Martin Järvi).

References

External links 
 Järvimuusika
 Järvide peres kõlab elav muusika unelaulukski
 Leigo järvedel kõlas laupäeval suurejooneline Järvi-muusika
 Dünastia. Perekond Järvi
 Estonia’s greatest musical family – the Järvis

Estonian musicians
Artist families
Year of birth missing (living people)